is a train station in Kushima, Miyazaki Prefecture, Japan.

Lines

Layout 
The station consists of a side platform serving a single track at grade with a siding. The station premises are located to one side of a modern concrete building most of which is occupied by a produce/seafood market. Within the station area are a waiting area and a staffed ticket window. Parking and a bike shed are available at the station forecourt. The station is not staffed by JR Kyushu but some types of tickets are available from the Kushima City Tourism Association which manages the ticket window as a kan'i itaku agent.

Adjacent stations

History
The line was then extended northwards in phases. The first major phase of expansion added 28.5 km of track and several stations, reaching Yowara, which opened as the new northern terminus on 15 April 1935. Kushima was one of the intermediate stations which opened on the same day. At the time of opening, the station was named  but was renamed Fushima on 1 October 1959. With the privatization of Japanese National Railways (JNR), the successor of JGR, on 1 April 1987, the station came under the control of JR Kyushu.

Passenger statistics
In fiscal 2016, the station was used by an average of 86 passengers (boarding only) per day.

Surrounding area
, literally, "The station at Kushima Station", a large marketplace selling local produce and seafood. This occupies the larger part of the building which also houses the railway station premises.

See also
List of railway stations in Japan

References

External links
Kushima (JR Kyushu)

Railway stations in Miyazaki Prefecture
Railway stations in Japan opened in 1935